Curd is obtained by coagulating milk in a sequential process called curdling.  It can be a final dairy product or the first stage in  cheesemaking.  The coagulation can be caused by adding rennet, a culture, or any edible acidic substance such as lemon juice or vinegar, and then allowing it to coagulate. The increased acidity causes the milk proteins (casein) to tangle into solid masses, or curds. Milk that has been left to sour (raw milk alone or pasteurized milk with added lactic acid bacteria) will also naturally produce curds, and sour milk cheeses are produced this way. Producing cheese curds is one of the first steps in cheesemaking; the curds are pressed and drained to varying amounts for different styles of cheese and different secondary agents (molds for blue cheeses, etc.) are introduced before the desired aging finishes the cheese. The remaining liquid, which contains only whey proteins, is the whey. In cow's milk, 90 percent of the proteins are caseins. Curds can be used in baking or may be consumed as a snack.

==Uses==

Curd products vary by region and include cottage cheese, curd cheese (both curdled by bacteria and sometimes also rennet), farmer cheese, pot cheese, queso blanco, and paneer. The word can also refer to a non-dairy substance of similar appearance or consistency, though in these cases a modifier or the word curdled is generally used.

In England, curds produced using rennet are referred to as junket; true curds and whey are produced from the natural separation of milk due to its environment (temperature, acidity). Curds are used to make pudding as well, with semolina, raisins, chopped nuts and other ingredients. This can be baked, or the curd pudding can be used to bake thin custard pancakes.

Cheese curds, drained of the whey and served without further processing or aging, are popular in some French-speaking regions of Canada, such as Quebec, parts of Ontario, and Atlantic Canada. These are often sold in snack-sized packaging and seen as a typically Canadian food item. Throughout Canada cheese curds are served with french fries and gravy in a popular snack called poutine. Curds are also typical of some Germanic-descent regions such as historic Waterloo County in Ontario.

In some parts of the Midwestern U.S., especially in Wisconsin, curds are eaten fresh without further additions, or they are breaded and fried.

In Turkey, curds are called keş and are served on fried bread and are also eaten with macaroni in the provinces of Bolu and Zonguldak.

In Sri Lanka, curd is eaten fresh as a dessert since antiquity. Usually buffalo curd cured in clay pots and served with kitul treacle (Caryota urens), is considered a delicacy in almost every part of the island. Although cows milk curd also is produced, Buffalo curd is the preferred variety. 

In Mexico, chongos zamoranos is a dessert prepared with milk curdled with sugar and cinnamon.

Albanian  is made by boiling whey for about 15 minutes and adding vinegar or lemon. The derivative is drained and salted to taste.  can be served immediately or refrigerated for a couple of days.

See also

 Aarts, Mongolian fermented curd, eaten as a dried snack or reconstituted as a hot beverage
Chongos zamoranos, a dessert prepared with milk curdled with sugar and cinnamon
Cuajada (or Coalhada), usually sweetened and eaten for breakfast or dessert, popular in Spain and Central America
Curd snack, a snack popular in the Baltic States
Çökelek, a form of fermented buttermilk or yogurt curd from Turkey
Farmer cheese
Hoop cheese
Key lime pie, prepared by curdling condensed milk
Kesú Paraguay, a Paraguayan formed cottage cheese
 Kurt or Qurut, central Asian cheese curd
Leipäjuusto, Finnish cheese
 Ostkaka, Swedish style cheese cake, some call it a Swedish National dish
 Paskha, a Russian Easter dessert made of quark
 Ricotta, an Italian whey cheese
 Skyr,  Icelandic curd
 Tofu, the coagulated product from soy milk, from eastern and south-eastern Asian countries
 Túró Rudi, a Hungarian chocolate bar with curd
 Urdă, a Balkan fresh white cheese made from whey.
List of dairy products

References

External links
 Food and Agriculture Organization of the United Nations

Curd
Dairy products
Cheese dishes